Massapequa Creek is a  long creek that runs through Nassau County, New York, and empties into South Oyster Bay. Most of the length of the creek exists within the Massapequa Preserve, a  wooded area that extends from the Southern State Parkway in the north to Merrick Road in the south.

Like all other rivers on Long Island, Massapequa Creek is fed primarily by groundwater. The creek's three tributaries rise in South Farmingdale, two of which merge in a pond next to Farmingdale High School before crossing under the Southern State Parkway. It continues on the other side of the parkway, joined by the eastern tributary, and crosses Linden Street and into the Massapequa Preserve, passing through three ponds before reaching the Massapequa Reservoir. From there, a spillway takes it under Sunrise Highway into wetland areas, and then into the Massapequa Lake. Two spillways at the south end of the lake pass under Merrick Road into a canal, which leads into Massapequa Cove and South Oyster Bay.

List of crossings of Massapequa Creek 
 Southern State Parkway
 Linden Street
 Clark Avenue
 Long Island Rail Road Babylon Branch
 Sunrise Highway
 Merrick Road

References 
Town of Oyster Bay MASSAPEQUA CREEK WATERSHED MANAGEMENT AND CORRIDOR RESTORATION PLAN, Dec.ny.gov
DOH Public Health Assessment LIBERTY INDUSTRIAL FINISHING CORPORATION, Albany.edu
Google Maps- Massapequa Cove, Google.com

Rivers of New York (state)
Bodies of water of Nassau County, New York